This is a list of women who have been elected or appointed deputy head of state of their respective countries. This list does not include female deputy heads of government who are not concurrently deputy head of state, such as deputy prime ministers.

List of female deputy heads of state

Italics denotes an acting head of state and states that are either de facto (with limited to no international recognition) or defunct.

See also
 Council of Women World Leaders
 List of current state leaders by date of assumption of office
List of elected and appointed female heads of state and government
List of elected or appointed female deputy heads of government
Women in government

References

External links
 Women Heads of State
 Women Presidents and Women Governors-General (Zárate's Political Collections)
 Council of Women World Leaders
 Female Vice Presidents

List of deputy
Heads of state
Female Heads of state
Elected or appointed deputy heads of state